Salagi Forest Park  is a forest park in the Gambia. Established on January 1, 1954, it covers 262 hectares.

It is located in the west of the country, at an altitude of 26 meters.

References

Protected areas established in 1954
Forest parks of the Gambia